The Luxembourg national rugby sevens team made up primarily from the XV Team competes annually in European competitions. Entered first tournament in 1996.

Tournament History

1996  Portugal
I
 Lisbon (1-2 June) 1997 Rugby World Cup 7s Qualifier 1

2000  Germany
II
 Heidelberg (10-11 June) 2001 Rugby World Cup 7s Europe Qualifier 1

2002  France  Spain  Germany
III
 Lunel (17-18 May) Euro Sevens I Qualifier 1

IV
 Madrid (15-16 June) Euro Sevens I Qualifier 4

V
 Heidelberg (17-18 August) Euro Sevens Championship

2003  Netherlands  Portugal
VI
 Amsterdam (17-18 May) Euro Sevens II Qualifier 1

VII
 Portugal, Lisbon (21-22 June) Euro Sevens II Qualifier 7

2004  Russia  Ukraine
VIII
 Moscow (19-20 June) Euro Sevens III Qualifier 5

IX
 Kyiv (26-27 June) Euro Sevens III Qualifier 6

2005  Croatia  France
X
 Split (17-18 June) Euro Sevens IV Qualifier 2

XI
 Lunel (25-26 June) Euro Sevens IV Qualifier 3

2006  Croatia  France
XII
 Split (27-28 May) Euro Sevens V Qualifier 2

XIII
Lunel (3-4 June) Euro Sevens V Qualifier 3

2007  France
XIV
 Lunel (2-3 June) Euro Sevens VI Qualifier 4

2008  Denmark  Greece
XV
 Odense (10-11 May) Euro Sevens Qualifier 1

XVI
Corfu (21-22 June) Euro Sevens Qualifier 6

2009  Poland  Greece
XVII
 Sopot (16-17 May) Euro Sevens Qualifier 1

XVIII
 Athens (23-24 May) Euro Sevens Qualifier 2

2010  Denmark  Croatia
XIX
 Odense (22-23 May) Euro Sevens Qualifier 2

XX
 Split (5-6 June) Euro Sevens Qualifier 5

2011  Latvia
XXI
 Riga (9-10 July) Euro Sevens Series Division B

2012  Switzerland
XXII
 Winterthur (2-3 June) Euro Sevens Series Division B

2013  Latvia
XXIII
 Riga (1-2 June) Euro Sevens Series Division B

2014  Czech Republic
XXIV
 Prague (28-29 June) Euro Sevens Division B North Zone

2015  Croatia
 Zagreb (20-21 June) Euro Sevens Series Division B

This tournament was valid as European Qualifier for the 2016 Olympic Games. Luxembourg withdrew prior to tournament.

2016  Bulgaria
XXV
 Bourgas (2-3 July) Euro 7s Conference 1

2017  Czech Republic  Romania
XXVI
 Ostavia (3-4 June) Trophy Leg 1

XXVII
 Bucharest (17-18 June) Trophy Leg 2

2018  Croatia  Lithuania
XXVIII
 Zagreb (8-9 June) Trophy Leg 1

XXIX
 Siaulai (31 June-1 July) Trophy Leg 2

2019  Croatia  Bosnia
XXX
 Zagreb (15-16 June) Trophy Leg 1

XXXI
 Zenica (22-23 June) Trophy Leg 2

Record

See also

 Luxembourg Rugby Federation
 Rugby union in Luxembourg
 Luxembourg women's national rugby union team
 Luxembourg national rugby union team

National rugby sevens teams
R